Barbed Wire is a 1991 Argentine and Italian film written and directed by Marco Bechis. The film stars Jacqueline Lustig, Martin Kalwill, and Arturo Maly.

Premise

The southernmost tip of Patagonia, in Argentina near to the Straits of Magellan, is an interesting place, with some of the roughest seas in the world.

It's a good location for a resort for travelers.  As such, a British corporation has purchased property to build an airport.

However, holding up plans is a stubborn Irish rancher who won't sell his land.

In order to fight the proposed plans, he fences in his land and at the same time fences in his two late-teenaged children.

Eva Logan (Jacqueline Lustig) is particularly frustrated at this event as it prevents any romantic options she has.

Cast
Jacqueline Lustig as Eva Logan
Martin Kalwill as Juan Loga
Arturo Maly as Harvey Logan 
Matthew Marsh as Wilson
Miguel Ángel Paludi as Father Corti
Luis Romero as Clerk
Gabriel Molinelli as Mechanic
Enrique Piñeyro as Policeman

Exhibition
The film was first presented at the Locarno Film Festival, Switzerland in August 1991.

Reception
Wins
 Havana Film Festival: Grand Coral - Third Prize, Marco Bechis; 1993.
 Imagi Madrid Film Festival - First Prize, President of the Jury Pedro Almodóvar; 1993.
 Sundance Film Festival - Park City, USA 1994.

Nominations
 Locarno International Film Festival: Golden Leopard, Marco Bechis; 1991.

References

External links
 Alambrado at the cinenacional.com .
 
 

1991 films
1991 drama films
1990s English-language films
Argentine independent films
Films directed by Marco Bechis
Italian independent films
1991 independent films
Argentine drama films
Italian drama films
1991 directorial debut films
1990s Italian films
1990s Argentine films
English-language Argentine films
English-language Italian films